Virginie Chauvel (born 25 June 1982) is a French rower. She competed in the women's coxless pair event at the 2004 Summer Olympics.

References

1982 births
Living people
French female rowers
Olympic rowers of France
Rowers at the 2004 Summer Olympics
Sportspeople from Nantes